The Samsung Galaxy A82 5G is Samsung Electronics' smartphone unveiled by Samsung Electronics. The phone has a triple-camera setup with a 64 MP main camera, a 6.7 in (161.9 mm) FHD+ Infinity-O display, and a 4500 mAh Li-Po battery. It ships with Android 11.

Samsung Galaxy Quantum 2 
Samsung Galaxy A82 5G was released as Samsung Galaxy Quantum 2 in South Korea.

References 

Samsung Galaxy
Mobile phones introduced in 2021
Android (operating system) devices
Samsung smartphones
Mobile phones with multiple rear cameras